Andrea Gadaldi (August 25, 1907 – January 16, 1993) was an Italian professional football player and coach.

He played for 10 seasons (271 games, 4 goals) in the Serie A for Brescia Calcio and A.S. Roma.

1907 births
1993 deaths
Italian footballers
Serie A players
Serie B players
Brescia Calcio players
A.S. Roma players
Italian football managers
Brescia Calcio managers
Association football defenders